Korean War Filmography is a 2003 non-fiction book written by Robert J. Lentz. Published by McFarland & Company, the book focuses on the films based upon the Korean War.

References

2003 non-fiction books
English-language books
American non-fiction books
Books about films